Silver Whisper is a cruise ship that entered service in 2001, and is operated by Silversea Cruises. The passenger capacity is 382 passengers, and there are 295 crew members. They both have a high space-to-passenger ratio—the ship's gross tonnage divided by the passenger capacity—at 74, providing more space per passenger than any other cruise ship. The passenger-to-crew ratio is also high, at 1.31 to 1.

Accommodations

Destinations 
On 6 January 2020, Silver Whisper, left Fort Lauderdale, Florida, to begin a journey that will take one hundred and forty days to visit sixty two port of calls on all seven continents. In March 2020, Silver Whisper was forced to end the Legends of Cruising world cruise due to the outbreak of the global coronavirus pandemic.

References

Notes

Bibliography

External links

Silversea: Silver Whisper – Silversea official site page about the ship
JN: Lisbon 2008 Silver Whisper Incident

Cruise ships
Ships built in Genoa
2000 ships
Ships built by T. Mariotti